The Port of Alcudia is a port facility in the town of Alcudia in northern Mallorca, Spain. It handles primarily passenger ferries, but also some bulk and breakbulk cargo and a dolphin berth for LPG carriers. 

It has ferry services to Menorca, Barcelona as well as Toulon in France.

References

Alcudia
Buildings and structures in the Balearic Islands
Transport in the Balearic Islands